Lilás (Purple) is the sixth album of singer and songwriter Brazilian Djavan released in 1984.

Track listing
"Lilás" – 4:43
"Infinito" – 5:19
"Esquinas" – 5:31
"Transe" – 4:54
"Obi" – 4:44
"Miragem" – 3:54
"Iris" – 3:44
"Canto da Lira" – 4:24
"Liberdade" – 4:18

References

1984 albums
Djavan albums